Baqiabad (also known as Baghi Abad) is a village in Shirkuh Rural District, in the Central District of Taft County, Yazd Province, Iran. At the 2006 census, its population was 108, in 37 families.

References 

Populated places in Taft County